The field hockey competitions at the 2017 Southeast Asian Games in Kuala Lumpur will take place at National Hockey Stadium in Bukit Jalil.

The 2017 Games feature competitions in two events (one event for each gender).

Competition schedule
The following was the competition schedule for the field hockey competitions:

Participation

Participating nations

Men's competition

Group stage

Women's competition

Group stage

Medal summary

Medal table

Medalists

References

External links
  

 
2017
 
Field hockey
Southeast Asian Games
2017 Southeast Asian Games